Distomus is a genus of ascidian tunicates in the family Styelidae.

Species within the genus Distomus include:
 Distomus antiborealis Monniot, Monniot, Griffiths & Schleyer, 2001 
 Distomus fuscus Delle Chiaje, 1841 
 Distomus hupferi (Michaelsen, 1904) 
 Distomus malayensis Sluiter, 1919 
 Distomus pacificus Monniot & Monniot, 1991 
 Distomus rudentiformis (Sluiter, 1915) 
 Distomus variolosus Gaertner, 1774

Species names currently considered to be synonyms:
 Distomus crystallinus (Renier, 1804): synonym of Polycitor crystallinus (Renier, 1804) 
 Distomus diptychos Hartmeyer, 1919: synonym of Stolonica diptycha (Hartmeyer, 1919) 
 Distomus elegans Quoy & Gaimard, 1834: synonym of Botryllus elegans (Quoy & Gaimard, 1834) 
 Distomus kukenthali (Gottschaldt, 1894): synonym of Eudistoma vitreum (Sars, 1851) 
 Distomus mamillaris Gaertner, 1774: synonym of Polycarpa mamillaris (Gaertner, 1774) 
 Distomus vitreum : synonym of Eudistoma vitreum (Sars, 1851)

References

Stolidobranchia
Tunicate genera
Taxa named by Joseph Gaertner